Katowice is the capital city of the Silesian Voivodeship in southern Poland and the central city of the Upper Silesian metropolitan area. It is the 11th most populous city in Poland, while its urban area is the most populous in the country and one of the most populous in the European Union.

Katowice has a population of 286,960 according to a 31 December 2021 estimate. Katowice is a central part of the Metropolis GZM, with a population of 2.3 million, and a part of a larger Upper Silesian metropolitan area that extends into the Czech Republic and has a population of 5-5.3 million people.

Throughout the mid-18th century, Katowice developed into a village following the discovery of rich coal reserves in the area. In the first half of the 19th century, intensive industrialization transformed local mills and farms into industrial steelworks, mines, foundries and artisan workshops. The city has since reshaped its economy from a heavy industry-based one to professional services, education and healthcare. The entire metropolitan area is the 16th most economically powerful city by GDP in the European Union with an output amounting to $114.5 billion.

Katowice has been classified as a Gamma - global city by the Globalization and World Cities Research Network and is a centre of commerce, business, transportation, and culture in southern Poland, with numerous public companies headquartered in the city or in its suburbs including energy group Tauron and metal industry corporation Fasing, important cultural institutions such as Polish National Radio Symphony Orchestra, award-winning music festivals such as Off Festival and Tauron New Music, and transportation infrastructure such as Katowice Korfanty Airport. It also hosts the finals of Intel Extreme Masters, an Esports video game tournament. Katowice is also home to several institutions of higher learning, notably the University of Silesia, the Silesian University of Technology and the Karol Szymanowski Academy of Music.

History

Before the industrial revolution

The area around Katowice, in Upper Silesia, has been inhabited by ethnic Silesian tribes from its earliest documented history. While the name Katowice (Katowicze) is mentioned for the first time in 1598, other villages and settlements that would eventually become parts of modern Katowice have been established earlier, with Dąb being the oldest, mentioned in 1299 for the first time in a document issued by Duke Casimir of Bytom. Bogucice, Ligota, Szopenice and Podlesie were all established in early 14th century. Aside from farming, people living in the area would also work in hammer mills: the first one, Kuźnica Bogucka, is mentioned in 1397.

The area which would become Katowice was initially ruled by the Polish Silesian Piast dynasty until its extinction. From 1327, the region was under administration of the Kingdom of Bohemia under the Holy Roman Empire. As part of the Bohemian Crown, it was passed to the Habsburg monarchy of Austria in 1526. In 1742, along with most of Silesia, it was seized by Prussia following the First Silesian War. The two subsequent Silesian Wars left the area severely depopulated and with economy in ruins. In 1838, Franz von Winckler bought Katowice from Karl Friedrich Lehmann and in 1841, he made it the headquarters of his estate.

Emergence as an industrial centre

On 3 October 1846, the works of the final stage of the Breslau-Myslowitz (Wrocław-Mysłowice) rail line ended, built and operated by the Upper Silesian Railway (Oberschlesische Eisenbahn, OSE). It was opened by the Prussian king Friedrich Wilhelm IV. A year later, on 6 August 1847, the first train arrived at the new Katowice station.

The railway connection with major European cities (Katowice gained connections to Berlin, Kraków, Vienna and Warsaw, among others, between 1847 and 1848) fostered economic and population growth. The population grew enough to erect the first Lutheran church on 29 September 1858 (Church of the Resurrection), and the first Catholic church two years later, on 11 November 1860. Katowice (then: Kattowitz) gained city status on 11 September 1865 in the Prussian Province of Silesia, by the act of the king Wilhelm I Hohenzollern.

The city flourished due to large mineral (especially coal) deposits in the area. Extensive city growth and prosperity depended on the coal mining and steel industries, which took off during the Industrial Revolution. The city was inhabited mainly by Germans, Poles incl. Silesians, and Jews. In 1884, 36 Jewish Zionist delegates met here, forming the Hovevei Zion movement. Previously part of the Beuthen district, in 1873 it became the capital of the new Kattowitz district. On 1 April 1899, the city was separated from the district, becoming an independent city.

In 1882, the Upper Silesian Coal and Steelworks Company (Oberschlesischer Berg- und Hüttenmännischer Verein) moved its headquarters to Katowice, followed by creation of the Upper Silesian Coal Convention (Oberschlesische Kohlen – Konvention) in 1898. Civic development followed industrial development: in 1851, the first post office opens in Katowice, and in 1893 the current regional post office headquarters have been opened; in 1871 the first middle school was opened (later expanded to high school); in 1889, Katowice got a district court; in 1895, the city bath opened and regional headquarters of the Prussian state railways has been established in the city; in 1907, the city theater (currently the Silesian Theatre) opened.

Under the Treaty of Versailles after World War I, the Upper Silesia plebiscite was organised by the League of Nations. Though Kattowitz proper voted 22,774 to remain in Germany and 3,900 for Poland, it was attached to Poland as the larger district voted 66,119 for Poland and 52,992 for Germany. Following the Silesian Uprisings of 1918–21 Katowice became part of the Second Polish Republic with some autonomy for the Silesian Parliament as a constituency and the Silesian Voivodeship Council as the executive body. In 1924, the surrounding villages and towns were incorporated into Katowice, and the number of inhabitants increased to over 112,000, since then the number of Poles exceeded the number of Germans - throughout the interwar period, the number of Germans decreased (in 1925 they constituted 12% of the inhabitants of Katowice, and in 1939 only 6%, while Poles constituted 93%). At the end of the interwar period, the number of inhabitants exceeded 134,000.

In the years 1926–1933, Katowice and the Polish part of Upper Silesia were connected with Gdynia and Polish part of Pomerania in the Polish Corridor through the Coal Trunk-Line.

World War II
During the early stages of World War II and the Poland Campaign, Katowice was essentially abandoned by the Polish Land Forces, which had to position itself around Kraków. Nevertheless, the city was defended by local Poles, and the invading Germans immediately carried out massacres of captured Polish defenders. In the following weeks the German Einsatzkommando 1 was stationed in the city, and its units were responsible for many crimes against Poles committed in the region.

Under German occupation many of the city's historical and iconic monuments were destroyed, most notably the Great Katowice Synagogue, which was burned to the ground on 4 September 1939. This was followed by the alteration of street names and the introduction of strict rules. Additionally, the use of Polish in public conversations was banned. The German administration was also infamous for organising public executions of civilians and by the middle of 1941, most of the Polish and Jewish population was expelled. The Germans established and operated a Nazi prison in the city, and multiple forced labour camps within present-day city limits, including two camps solely for Poles (Polenlager), four camps solely for Jews, two subcamps (E734, E750) of the Stalag VIII-B/344 prisoner-of-war camp, and a subcamp of the Auschwitz concentration camp. Eventually, Katowice was liberated by the Red Army in January 1945. Significant parts of the downtown and inner suburbs were demolished during the occupation. This, however, cannot be compared with Warsaw, where the level of destruction reached 85%. As a result, the authorities were able to preserve the central district in its prewar character.

Postwar period
The postwar period of Katowice was characterised by the time of heavy industry development in the Upper Silesian region, which helped the city in regaining its status as the most industrialised Polish city and a major administrative centre. As the city developed so briskly, the 1950s marked a significant increase in its population and an influx of migrants from the Eastern Borderlands, the so-called Kresy. The city area began to quickly expand by incorporating the neighbouring communes and counties. However, the thriving industrial city also had a dark period in its short but meaningful history. Most notably, between 7 March 1953 and 10 December 1956, Katowice was called Stalinogród in honour of Joseph Stalin, leader of the Soviet Union. The change was brought upon by an issued decree of the State Council. The date of the alteration of the city name was neither a coincidence or accidental as it happened on the day of Stalin's death. In this way, the Polish United Workers' Party and the socialist authority wanted to pay tribute to the dictator. The new name never got accepted by the citizens and in 1956 the former Polish name was restored.

The following decades were more memorable in the history of Katowice. Regardless of its industrial significance, it started to become an important cultural and educational centre in Central and Eastern Europe. In 1968, the University of Silesia in Katowice, the largest and most valued college in the area, was founded. Simultaneously the construction of large housing estates began to evolve. Furthermore, many representative structures were erected at that time, including the Silesian Insurgents' Monument (1967) and Spodek (1971), which have become familiar landmarks and tourist sights. The 1960s and 1970s saw the evolution of modernist architecture and functionalism. Katowice eventually developed into one of the most modernist post-war cities of Poland.

One of the most dramatic events in the history of the city occurred on 16 December 1981. It was then that 9 protesters died (7 were shot dead; 2 died from injury complications) and another 21 were wounded in the pacification of Wujek Coal Mine. The Special Platoon of the Motorized Reserves of the Citizens' Militia (ZOMO) was responsible for the brutal handling of strikers protesting against Wojciech Jaruzelski's declaration of martial law and the arrest of Solidarity trade union officials. On the 10th anniversary of the event, a memorial was unveiled by the President of Poland Lech Wałęsa.

In 1990, the first democratic local elections that took place marked a new period in the city's history. The economy of Katowice has been transforming from the heavy industry of steel and coal mines into "one of the most attractive investment areas for modern economy branches in Central Europe". Recently, the city's efficient infrastructure, rapid progress in the overall development and an increase in office space has made Katowice a popular venue for conducting business. The Katowice Expo Centre (Katowickie Centrum Wystawiennicze) organises trade fairs or exhibitions and attracts investors from all over the world. In 2018, the city was the host of the 24th Session of the Conference of the Parties to the United Nations Framework Convention on Climate Change (UNFCCC COP24). In 2022, the city hosted the 11th edition of the World Urban Forum, the world's most important conference on sustainable urbanization and development of cities.

Geography
Kłodnica and Rawa (tributaries of the Oder and the Vistula respectively) are the largest rivers in Katowice, and the border between catchment areas of Oder and Vistula goes through the city.

Climate
Katowice has a temperate, ocean-moderated humid continental climate (Köppen climate classification: Dfb/Cfb).

Neighborhoods
Katowice has 22 officially recognized neighborhoods. Śródmieście, Osiedle Paderewskiego-Muchowiec, Zawodzie and Koszutka form the dense central urban core where most cultural and educational institutions, businesses and administrative buildings are located.

Most Northern and Eastern neighborhoods around the downtown core are more working-class and developed from worker's estates build around large industry such as coal mines, manufactures and steelworks. Each of these neighborhoods has its own dense commercial strip surrounded by mid-rise apartment buildings and some single-family homes. Szopienice, located between downtown Katowice and Mysłowice, used to be a separate town until mid-1960s. Nikiszowiec, a former mine's town, has undergone strong gentrification in recent years, and emerged as a major tourist attraction in the region thanks to its unique architecture and art galleries.

Western and Southern neighborhoods (with the exception of Brynów-Załęska Hałda, which is a working-class neighborhood built around a coal mine) are more suburban in nature, concentrating the city's middle and upper middle classes.

Metropolitan area
Katowice lies in the centre of the largest conurbation in Poland, one of the largest in the European Union, numbering about 2.7 million. The Katowice urban area consists of about 40 adjacent cities and towns, the whole Silesian metropolitan area (mostly within the Upper Silesian Coal Basin) over 50 cities or towns. The metropolitan area has a population of 5,294,000. In 2006, Katowice and 14 adjacent cities united as the Upper Silesian Metropolis. Its population is 2 million and its area is 1,104 km2. In 2006–2007 the union planned to unite these cities in one city under the name "Silesia", but this proved unsuccessful.

The Katowice conurbation comprises settlements which have evolved because of the mining of metal ores, coal and raw rock materials. The establishment of mining and heavy industry which have developed for the past centuries has resulted in the unique character of the cityscape; its typical aspects are the red brick housing estates constructed for the poorer working class, factory chimneys, manufacturing plants, power stations and quarries. The inhabitants of a large mining community like Katowice, and local administrations within the conurbation, which have only evolved due to mining, are a subject to overall decline after the liquidation of coal mines and factories. This is one of the reasons which led to the development of the service sector, including office spaces, shopping centres and tourism.

Demographics

There were 139,274 males and 153,500 females. Age breakdown of people in Katowice is: 12.9% 0–14 years old, 13.7% 15–29 years old, 23.8% 30–44 years old, 19.5% 45–59 years old, 20.1% 60–74 years old, and 9.9% 75 years and older.

Katowice is a centre of the Upper Silesian metropolitan area, with a population of approx. 5.3 million. This metropolitan area extends into the neighboring Czechia, where the other centre is the city of Ostrava. 41 municipalities that constitute the core of the metropolitan area created the Silesian Metropolis association, which has 2.3 million people

Historical population
Katowice's population grew very fast between 1845 and 1960, fueled by the expansion of heavy industry and administrative functions. In the 60s, 70s and 80s, the city grew by another 100,000 people, reaching a height of 368,621 in 1988. Since then, the collapse of heavy industry, emigration, and suburbanization reversed the population development; Katowice lost approx. 75,000 people (20%) since the fall of communism in Poland.

Before World War II, Katowice was mainly inhabited by Poles and Germans. The 1905 Silesian demographic census has shown that Germans made up nearly 70-75% of the total population (with German Jews) and  Poles constituted 25-30% of inhabitants of Katowice. After the plebiscite in Upper Silesia, Silesian uprisings and the incorporation of Katowice into Poland in 1922, and then the incorporation of several nearby villages and towns into the city, the number of inhabitants of Katowice increased significantly, but the number of Germans in Katowice fell to 12% in 1925 and to 6% in 1939 (most Germans left Poland, and areas with a Polish majority were incorporated). Thus, in 1939 Katowice was inhabited in 93% by Poles, 6% by Germans and 1% by Jews.

After the German aggression against Poland in 1939, some Poles were displaced from Katowice and settled with Germans, this process was interrupted during the occupation of Katowice by the Red Army in 1945, and then practically the entire German minority was displaced. After 1945, Polish exiles from Kresy (Eastern Borderlands) and Polish people from other work regions (including for work purposes) came to the city. Most pre-war citizens (excluding Poles) were forcibly expelled by the new authorities.

During the war, the Nazi occupant committed severe crimes against the local Roma and Jewish communities. Most of them were eventually killed or transported by cattle wagons to concentration camps such as Auschwitz for complete extermination. This led to a population drop between 1939 and 1945.

Ethnic diversity
Currently, Katowice is one of the more diverse cities in Poland.  of 310,764 inhabitants, 81,500 (26.2%) declared a nationality other than Polish or Polish nationality and, at the same time, a different nationality (two nationalities can be declared in Polish censuses), with top other nationalities being the indigenous Silesians (78,838), but most of which declared both Silesian and Polish at the same time (possibility to declare two), and Germans (1,058). Additionally, 5,614 (1.8%) people either did not declare a nationality, or stated they have no nationality. When counting the declared two nationalities, 90.1% of the inhabitants of Katowice declared Polish nationality. Linguistic diversity is smaller in Katowice; 97.1% of people speak Polish at home, 2.9% speak only non-Polish language while 5.3% speak Polish and at least one other language. The most spoken minority languages include: Silesian (22,730, 7.3%), English (1,313, 0.4%) and German (969, 0.3%).

Since the 2011 census, the international population have risen in Katowice with the post-2014 increase in immigration to Poland, with the primary nationality being Ukrainians. According to the Polish Ministry of Development, Labor and Technology, there have been 20,527 foreigners (7% of official population figure) on a special worker permit for citizens of Belarus, Georgia, Moldova, Russia, Serbia and Ukraine in Katowice in 2020, 19,003 of them from Ukraine. By the end of 2021, this number has increased to 26,990, 23,207 of them from Ukraine. Additionally,  11,568 refugees settled in Katowice since the start of the Russian invasion on Ukraine.

Socioeconomics
The 2011 census found out that, among population aged 25 and older, 26.7% of Katowice residents had a college degree, 35% had a high school degree but no college degree, 22.3% had trade school diploma, and the rest had primary or junior high school education only. In the 25-34 age group, college graduates share is 44.9%, and an additional 31.8% has a high school degree. According to Eurostat data, Katowice and its surrounding Silesian region had one of the highest share of people who have attained at least an upper secondary level of education (more than 90%), and one of the lowest share of school dropouts in Europe (less than 5%).

There were 134,199 households in Katowice,  census, with an average household size of 2.3 people. 32.7% households were single-person households, 29.4% had two people, 20.5% had three people, 12.5% had four people and 4.9% had five people or more.

Katowice has the 3rd-highest wages in Poland, behind Jastrzębie-Zdrój and Warsaw only and slightly ahead of Gdańsk, at PLN 6,176 a month. Poverty rate places Katowice on average with other big cities in Poland, at 4.09% of inhabitants eligible for welfare benefits

Religion
Roman Catholicism is the main religion in Katowice;  Polish census, 82.43% (256,166) people in Katowice declared to be Catholic. Other denominations with at least 1,000 worshippers include the Lutheran Church in Poland – 0.43% (1,336 people) and Jehovah's Witnesses – 0.42% (1,311 people). 4.47% (13,900) people in Katowice stated they are atheist, while 12% (37,029) people refused to state their religious affiliation. Other religions with presence and places of worship in the city include Judaism, Islam, and Buddhism, as well as other Protestant denominations.

Christianity

Katowice is the seat of the Roman Catholic Archdiocese, with the suffragan bishoprics of Gliwice and Opole, and around 1,477,900 Catholics. The Cathedral of Christ the King, constructed between 1927 and 1955 in a classicist style, is the largest cathedral in Poland. There are 36 Catholic churches in Katowice (including two basilicas), as well as 18 monasteries. Katowice is also a seat of a diocesan Catholic seminary, as well as one of the Order of Friars Minor. Katowice Archdiocese owns several media companies headquartered in Katowice: Księgarnia św. Jacka, a Catholic publishing company, and Instytut Gość Media, a multi-channeled media company that owns Radio eM, a regional Catholic radio, and a few magazines. Gość Niedzielny, owned by Instytut Gość Media and published in Katowice, is currently the most-popular Catholic magazine in the country with approx. 120,000 copies sold weekly.

Katowice is also the seat of a Lutheran Diocese which covers Upper Silesia, Lesser Poland and Subcarpathian region and has 12,934 adherents  Lutherans have two churches in Katowice, including a cathedral, which is the oldest church built originally in Katowice, completed on 29 September 1858. Historically, Lutheran population in Katowice was mostly German, and with the expulsion of Germans from Poland after the Second World War, number of Lutherans dropped in Katowice.

Other denominations with churches or praying houses in Katowice include Seventh Day Adventists, Baptists, Christ Church in Poland, Pentecostals and other evangelical groups.

Judaism

Judaism has historically been present in Katowice since at least 1702. First synagogue, designed by a local architect Ignatz Grünfeld, was consecrated on 4 September 1862, while the Jewish cemetery was established in 1868. Dr. Jacob Cohn was the first rabbi of Katowice, appointed to this function on 6 January 1872 and holding it until 1920s. Zionism was strong in Katowice, and in 1884 the city was the place of the Katowice Conference, the first public Zionist meeting in history. On 12 September 1900, the Great Synagogue was opened.

Following World War I and subsequent creation of the Polish state, most Katowice Jews, who identified with Germany, left the city and settled primarily in Bytom, a nearby city that was still part of Germany. They were partially replaced by Jews moving from the East, particularly the neighboring Dąbrowa Basin region that had a large Jewish population. In 1931, 60% of 5,716 Jews in Katowice were recent immigrants from other parts of Poland. On 1 September 1939, Poland was attacked by Nazi Germany, and Katowice, a border city, surrendered on 3 September. The Great Synagogue was burned by the German army the same day, and in the following months, Katowice Jews were deported to ghettos in Dąbrowa Basin (primarily Sosnowiec and Będzin) or directly to various concentration and death camps where most of them perished in the Holocaust. After the war, around 1,500 Jews were living in Katowice, but most of them left Poland and emigrated to the United States and other Western countries.

Currently, Katowice has one Qahal with approximately 200 members. It owns houses of prayer in Katowice (along with a kosher cafeteria) and nearby Gliwice, and the current rabbi is Yehoshua Ellis.

Other religions
There are two buddhist groups in Katowice: Kwan Um School of Zen, first registered in 1982, and the Diamond Road of Karma Kagyu line association. Jehovah's Witnesses maintain 13 houses of prayer and one Kingdom Hall in Katowice. Aside from Polish-language congregations, there is one for English speakers and one for Ukrainian speakers.

Architecture and urban design

Unlike most other large Polish cities, Katowice did not originate as a medieval town, therefore it does not have an old town with a street layout and architectural styles characteristic to cities founded on Magdeburg rights. Katowice's urban layout is a result of expansion and annexation of various towns, industrial worker estates, and villages.

City centre 
Katowice city centre has an axis design, along the main railway line, developed by an industrialist Friedrich Grundman in mid-19th century. Most of the city centre in Katowice developed in late 19th and early 20th century, when it was part of the Kingdom of Prussia and had a German-speaking majority. As a result, architectural styles of that era are similar to those in other Prussian cities such as Berlin or Wrocław (then Breslau); primarily renaissance revival and baroque revival, with some buildings in gothic revival, romanesque revival, and art nouveau styles.

Interwar architecture 

In 1922, Katowice and the eastern portion of Upper Silesia were reintegrated with reborn Poland, and an autonomous Silesian Voivodeship was established, with Katowice as its capital. This event has marked the beginning of a period of unprecedented architectural development in the city. Since most traditional styles, especially gothic and gothic revival, were perceived as connected to imperial Germany by the new Polish authorities, all new development was to be built in, at first in the neoclassical, and later in functionalist/Bauhaus style. The city, which needed to build administrative buildings for the new authorities and housing for people working in regional administration, began expansion southward creating one of the largest complexes of modern architecture in Poland, comparable to Warsaw and Gdynia (newly built port on the Baltic Sea) only.

The modernist district is centered around the monumental Silesian Parliament building (1923-1929), which architecture is mostly functionalist but still will neoclassical references on the facades. During World War II, the building became headquarters of the Reichsgau Oberschlesien and part of the interior was redesigned by Albert Speer, Hitler's favorite architect, to resemble the interior of the Reich Chancellery. The nearby Cathedral of Christ the King (1927-1955, with dome lowered by 34 meters compared to original design) is also neoclassical but with an ascetic interior (including a tabernacle and a golden mosaic funded by future pope, Joseph Ratzinger). Other buildings, designed in mid-to-late 1920s and 1930s, are mostly modernist or functionalist. A symbol of the city in the interwar period, Drapacz Chmur (literally: The Skyscraper), was the first skyscraper built in Poland after World War I, and the first building in the country to be based on a steel frame.

Post-war architecture 

After World War II, Katowice again expected a period of rapid growth, particularly under the regional leadership of Marshall Jerzy Ziętek. Pałac Młodzieży (Youth Palace) became the first major new building completed in Katowice after the war, erected in the socrealist style with elements of late modernism in 1949–1951. The largest development of the 1950s in Katowice was the expansion of the Koszutka neighborhood, also in the socialist realist style, in early 1950s.

Following the death of Stalin in 1956, and the end of socrealism, Jerzy Ziętek and city authorities commissioned a group of young architects and urbanists to create a project of the new urban design of Katowice. The collective, called Miastoprojekt Katowice, came up with a design heavily influenced by Le Corbusier's ideas. The project was centered around a grand avenue (current Aleja Korfantego) surrounded by simple, modern blocks and monuments, scattered in distance to each other according to modernist ideals. The most important buildings from that time include:

 Spodek Arena (1964–1971), widely considered the symbol of Katowice and ranked among the finest achievements of modern architecture in Poland; one of the first buildings in the world with a tensegrity rooftop. Arena's unique design (resembling an UFO) comes from the need to accommodate different functions inside 
 Katowice Railway Station (1959–1972), considered to be the most outstanding example of brutalism in Poland, controversially demolished in 2010 and partially rebuilt as an addition to the Galeria Katowicka shopping centre.  
 Superjednostka (1967–1972), a massive (187.5 meters length, 51 meters high) residential block heavily inspired by Le Corbusier's Unite d'habitation in Marseille
 Osiedle Gwiazdy (1978–1985), a housing estate of eight 27-floor residential buildings on a plan resembling a star
 Osiedle Tysiąclecia (1961–1982, later expanded), a large housing estate connecting to the Silesian Park, built with modernist principles (separation of foot and automobile traffic, vast green spaces, self-sufficiency in terms of schools, basic shops and healthcare). Later expansion of the estate includes Kukurydze high-rises, a group of 26-floor high residential towers inspired by Marina City in Chicago
 Stalexport Towers (1979–1982), twin office towers with 22 and 20 floors, showing influences of postmodernism

Contemporary architecture 

Following the collapse of communism in Poland and other Eastern Bloc countries, and the centrally-planned economy with it, Katowice's economy suffered a downturn, due to reduced significance of heavy industry. As a result, except for residential (primarily suburban) construction, not many buildings were built. One of the most significant buildings of the 1990s was the new branch of the Silesian Library, in postmodernism style.

The situation changed in the early aughts, when several new notable developments were completed:

 Chorzowska 50 (1999–2001) – first modern, A-grade office building in Katowice; currently owned and occupied by ING Bank Śląski 
 Altus, previously known as Uni Centrum (2001–2003) – for many years the highest skyscraper in Poland outside of Warsaw, at 125 meters (410 ft) high. Qubus Hotel, which was located in Altus, was one of the first four-star hotels in southern Poland.
 Silesia City Center (2003–2005), the flagship brownfield development of the era, built in place a defunct coal mine Gottwald.
 Dom z Ziemi Śląskiej (2001–2002), a modern suburban villa, nominated to Mies van der Rohe Award in 2002

Another wave of architectural revival came after Poland joined the European Union in 2004. European cohesion funds, along with private capital investment, flew into the city resulting in a number of architecturally interesting buildings and complexes, including:

 Strefa Kultury (Zone of Culture, a brownfield urban redevelopment in downtown Katowice): 
 National Polish Radio Symphony Orchestra (NOSPR) building (2012–2014) contains two concert halls (for an audience of 1,800 or 300). Nominated to Mies van der Rohe Award in 2014, first prize in European Commercial Property Awards.
 Katowice International Conference Centre (2012–2015), the largest conference centre in Poland (capacity up to 12,000 people), connected to the Spodek Arena. The design of the centre, with a distinct canyon going through it in order to remove any obstruction from view of Spodek, has been hailed and the building was nominated to Mies van der Rohe award in 2017
 New Silesian Museum (2011–2013) located in place of a former coal mine, most of the museum is located underground, with only glass cubes that provide daylight, visible above ground. Shortlisted for Mies van der Rohe award in 2015.
 CINiBA (2009–2011) – academic library of the University of Silesia and Katowice University of Economics, shortlisted to Mies van der Rohe award in 2013.
 Krzysztof Kieślowski Film School at the University of Silesia (2014–2017) – awarded with Wienerberger Brick Award in 2020, shortlisted to Mies van der Rohe award in 2019. Located in a decayed neighborhood, the building aims at kick-starting an urban renewal process there.
 KTW Towers (2018–2022), the taller tower, which is still under construction, is expected to become the tallest building in Katowice, at 135 meters (443 ft), and one of the tallest in Poland.

Tourist attractions

Market square and adjacent streets: Warszawska, Teatralna, Dyrekcyjna, Staromiejska, Dworcowa, św. Jana, Pocztowa, Wawelska, 3 Maja, Stawowa, Mielęckiego, Starowiejska and Mickiewicza, the so-called "Great Market Square of Katowice" or "Old town of Katowice"—many historic (monument) buildings. This is a group of functional-architectural. On the market square and most of the above-mentioned streets are prohibitions or restrictions on cars. Streets: Staromiejska, Dyrekcyjna, Wawelska, Stawowa and Warszawska is lined decorative cobblestone creating a pedestrian zone. The authority plans to Katowice—Quarter streets: św. Jana, Dworcowa, Mariacka, Mielęckiego, Stanisława and Starowiejska is to become so "small market square".
Nikiszowiec – historical settlement of Katowice, candidate to UNESCO
Cathedral of Christ the King
St Mary's Church
Church of the Resurrection, Evangelical-Augsburg, built in 1856–1858
Church of St Michael Archangel, the oldest church in the city, built in 1510
Drapacz Chmur, one of the first skyscrapers in Europe
Silesian Parliament, built in 1925–1929. For a very long time, it was the biggest structure in Poland
Modernist old town
Spodek (a large sports centre/concert hall, whose name translates as the 'saucer', from its distinctive shape resembling a UFO flying saucer)
Silesian Insurgents Monument (Polish: Pomnik Powstańców Śląskich), the largest and heaviest monument in Poland. It is a harmonious combination of architecture and sculpture with appropriate symbolism: the wings symbolize the three Silesian Uprisings (1920 – 1921) while the names of places that were battlefields are etched on the vertical slopes. The monument, which was funded by the people of Warsaw for Upper Silesia, is considered Katowice's landmark.
Silesian Theater, built in 1907
Rialto Cinetheater, built in 1912
Silesian Museum, built in 1899
Old train station in Katowice, built in 1906
The Goldstein Palace
The Załęże Palace
It was used in the first days of World War II and is the only parachute tower in Poland.

Other:
Franciscan Monastery in Panewniki
Church of St Joseph (Załęże)
St Stephen's Church
Church of Christ Resurrection
The Monument to Marshal Piłsudski by Croatian sculptor Antun Augustinčić, 1937–39. It was commissioned in 1936 but brought to Poland in 1991
Monopol Hotel
Katowice Rondo, the large square/roundabout, reconstructed recently, with the semi-circular Galeria Rondo Sztuki in the centre.
The Altus Skyscraper, the tallest skyscraper

Economy

Katowice has been classified as a Gamma - global city by the Globalization and World Cities Research Network and is considered as an emerging metropolis. Katowice's metropolitan area is the 16th most economically powerful urban area in the European Union by GDP, with an output amounting to $114.5 billion. The city is one of the major industrial, commerce and financial hubs of Poland and has successfully transformed its economy from heavy industry-based to knowledge-based one.

Katowice has a diversified economy with one of the strongest job markets in Poland. 171,839 Katowice residents are employed as of 2019, and 113,830 commute to work in the city - making Katowice second only to Warsaw in terms of commuter inflows in the country. Unemployment rate is extremely low at 1.8%, as of June 2022. The broader Katowice subregion (NUTS-3 level in European statistics) which includes neighboring towns of Chorzów, Siemianowice Śląskie, Mysłowice, Ruda Śląska, and Świętochłowice had 377,600 employed persons as of 2019, of which 22% in industry, 6% in construction, 23% in retail and services, 5% in information and communication, 5% in finance and insurance, 2% in real estate, 10% in professional services and science, 23% in education, health and administration and 4% in arts and entertainment.

As of 2018, Katowice had the 10th highest salaries in Poland, at PLN 5,698.98 per month, on average.

Business and commerce 
Katowice is a large business, convention and trade fair centre. Katowice is headquarters to 18 public companies traded on the Warsaw Stock Exchange, with total market value of PLN 24.2 billion as of 2016, with the largest being ING Bank Śląski. As of 2019, 38 companies from Katowice make the list of 2000 largest enterprises in Poland according to Rzeczpospolita, with largest one being Tauron Polska Energia S.A. (10th place). As of 2012, 44,050 companies were registered in Katowice, almost 10% of all companies in the Silesian Voivodeship.

Retail is a very strong sector in Katowice. The city is home to several shopping centres and department stores, with Silesia City Center and Galeria Katowicka being the largest ones. Silesia City Center, located on a brownfield in place of a former coal mine, is the largest shopping centre in Poland when number of stores is considered (310 different brands) and 7th largest in terms of retail space for rent . It is also a part of a broader revitalization complex, that features an apartment complex and office space (under construction as of October 2020) as well.

Katowice is also the seat of Katowice Special Economic Zone (Katowicka Specjalna Strefa Ekonomiczna).

Industry 
Since its creation, Katowice's development was tightly connected to heavy industry, especially coal mining, steelworks and machine production. In 1931, 49.5% of inhabitants worked in industry, and 12.5% in coal mining alone. In 1989 industry accounted for 36% of all jobs in the city (112,000 employees). As of 2018, 34,294 people worked in industry in Katowice, 20.4% of total, below the national average.

The first reported coal mine in Katowice (Murcki coal mine) was established in 1740, and in 1769 construction on Emanuelssegen mine started. As the demand for coal kept rising in the Kingdom of Prussia, further mines were opened: Beata (1801), Ferdinand (1823), Kleofas (1845). Later in 19th and early 20th century additional mines were opened: Katowice, Wujek, Eminenz (later renamed Gottwald and merged with Kleofas), Wieczorek, Boże Dary, Staszic and renewed Murcki. Currently only one (Murcki-Staszic) remains in operation. Katowice is also the seat of Polska Grupa Górnicza, the largest coal mining corporation in Europe. Metallurgy was another important part of Katowice's economy. In 1863 a dozen zinc metallurgy facilities were reported in Katowice, with Wilhelmina (founded in 1834) being the largest. In early 1900s, Wilhelmina (later renamed Huta Metali Niezależnych Szopienice) was enlarged and became the largest Silesian producer of non-ferrous metals and world's largest producer of cadmium. Two major steelworks existed in the city: Huta Baildon, established in 1823 by the Scottish engineer and industrialist John Baildon (declared bankruptcy in 2001), and Huta Ferrum, established in 1874 and operating to this date in limited capacity.

Culture

A vibrant and progressive artistic communities, particularly around musical arts, make Katowice one of the leading cultural spots in Poland. Since mid-2000s, Katowice has established a strategy to redevelop the post-industrial areas using culture - the pinnacle of which was a massive development on the site of a former coal mine known as Strefa Kultury (the "Zone of Culture"), where numerous cultural and convention institutions are located.

Performing arts 
Katowice's status as the UNESCO City of Music, designated when Katowice joined UNESCO Creative Cities Network in 2015, comes from a long and rich history of musical arts. Katowice is the seat of an internationally renowned Karol Szymanowski Academy of Music, whose faculty and graduates created the nationally important informal group called the Silesian school of composers. Polish National Radio Symphony Orchestra has been located in Katowice since 1945 and has gotten a new internationally acclaimed concert hall in 2014, built on a site of a former coal mine near Katowice's city center. The Silesian Philharmonic also has its seat in Katowice. The city is a venue for numerous classical concerts and festivals, such as: the International Festival of Young Music Competition Laureates, Grzegorz Fitelberg International Competition for Conductors, Chamber Music Festival, Ars Cameralis Festival and Katowice's opera, operettas and most of all ballet.

There are currently 6 theater buildings in Katowice, and some theater groups without a permanent location. Teatr Śląski is the oldest still-functioning theater in Katowice, first opened for audience in 1907 and located on the main square. It was the first theater to give plays in Silesian dialect of Polish. Every first Monday of the month, the Silesian Opera singers from nearby Bytom give a performance there, as Katowice does not have an opera house of its own. Teatr Ateneum is an important puppetry theater, while Teatr Korez was one of the first non-public theaters in post-war Poland.

Katowice is home to many nationally and internationally renowned popular music festivals. Rawa Blues, named after a stream that passes through Katowice's city center, is one of the largest blues festivals in Europe. Electronic music's Mayday Festival takes place every year in early November and is a sister event to its namesake in Dortmund. OFF Festival, dedicated to alternative music, moved to Katowice in 2010 and has been held every August. Tauron Nowa Muzyka festival, oriented more towards dance and techno has been named one of the major European festivals to attend. Other music festivals, such as the Silesian Jazz Festival, KatoHej (dedicated to chants and touristic music), and Gardens of Sound, are also organized. In 2019, 475,806 people attended various big cultural events such as concerts and festivals, which gave the city the third place in Poland, behind Warsaw and Kraków. Nearby Chorzów, with the Silesian Stadium right across the street from Katowice, gathered another 319,783 attendees.

Museums and art galleries 
The Silesian Museum is the largest and most-important museum in Katowice. It originally opened in 1929, and its radically modern, Bauhaus-style new building was demolished immediately after the Nazis seized Katowice in 1939, considering it too degenerate and too Polish. The museum has been placed in temporary buildings with its collections dispersed until 2015, when a new, mostly underground building has been constructed in the Zone of Culture. The museum exhibits works by famous and renowned Polish artists like Józef Chełmoński, Artur Grottger, Tadeusz Makowski, Jacek Malczewski, Jan Matejko, Józef Mehoffer and Stanisław Wyspiański. It is also well known for its collection of naïve art paintings, including local coal miners from Katowice area. The museum has a number of sketches of globally recognizable artists such as Albrecht Dürer and Rembrandt.

The City History Museum of Katowice exhibitions include: immersive typical urban apartments from early 20th century, naïve art paintings from local artists and the history of Katowice from a village to an industrial center. Other museums in Katowice include Museum of the History of Computers and Informatics and the Museum of Smallest Books in the World.

The BWA Contemporary Art Gallery in Katowice, established in 1949, is a notable institution concerning the Contemporary arts. Every three years, it is responsible for organizing the Polish Graphic Art Triennial. Several other galleries feature exhibitions of the works by artists from abroad along with film screenings, workshops for children and public fairs.

Media
TV stations:
TVP 3 Katowice
TVS (TV Silesia)
TVN24 – department Katowice (TVN24 – oddział Katowice)
radio stations:
Radio Katowice
Antyradio
newspapers:
Dziennik Zachodni
Gazeta Wyborcza – Katowice section
Fakt – Katowice section
Metro International – Katowice
Nowy Przegląd Katowicki

Festivals and events

 Rawa Blues Festiwal – Spodek
Metalmania – Spodek
Off Festival
Mayday – Spodek
International Competition of Conductors by Fitelberg
International Cycling Film Festival
International Festival of Military Orchestras
International Exhibition of Graphic arts "Intergrafia"
Esports tournament ESL One Katowice Tournament in 2015.
Esports tournament Intel Extreme Masters World Championship, one of the biggest esports events in the world
Poland hosted the 24th Session of the Conference of the Parties to the United Nations Framework Convention on Climate Change (UNFCCC COP24), with the meeting held in Katowice.

Parks and squares
parks:
Silesian Park (Wojewódzki Park Kultury i Wypoczynku)
Kościuszko Park (Park im. Tadeusza Kościuszki)
Forest Park of Katowice (Katowicki Park Leśny)
Valley of Three Ponds (Dolina Trzech Stawów)
Zadole Park

squares:
 Katowice market square (Rynek w Katowicach)
Freedom Square (Plac Wolności)
Andrzej Square (Plac Andrzeja)
Miarka Square (Plac Miarki)
Council of Europe Square (Plac Rady Europy)
Alfred Square (Plac Alfreda)
A. Budniok Square (Plac A. Brudnioka)
J. Londzin Square (Plac J. Londzina)
A. Hlond Square (Plac A. Hlonda)

Nature reserves and ecological areas

Nature reserve Las Murckowski
Nature reserve Ochojec
Szopienice-Borki
Źródła Kłodnicy
Staw Grunfeld
Stawy Na Tysiącleciu
Płone Bagno

Education

Katowice is a large scientific centre. It has over 20 schools of higher education, at which over 100,000 people study.

 University of Silesia in Katowice
 University of Economics in Katowice
 Medical University of Silesia
 Silesian University of Technology
 University of Social Sciences and Humanities
 Karol Szymanowski Academy of Music
 Akademia Lospuma Training Institute
 Academy of Fine Arts in Katowice
 Academy of Physical Education im. Jerzy Kukuczka in Katowice
 Higher Silesian Seminary in Katowice
There are also:
around 80 high schools
around 35 gimnasia
around 55 primary schools
around 50 libraries, including the Silesian Library

Transportation

Public transportation

The public transportation system of the Katowice consists of commuter and long-distance trains, trams, buses and city bikes. Around 38 percent of people in Katowice use trams and buses on their daily commute (40 percent if counted those using the park-and-ride facilities), 10 percent walk, 4 percent cycle, and 2 percent takes the train, according to a 2020 report. There are also three park-and-ride centers in Katowice with over 1,000 parking spaces.

Tram and bus lines 
The transit authority of the Upper Silesian Metropolis, Zarząd Transportu Metropolitalnego (ZTM), operates the city trams and buses.

The Silesian Interurban tram system is one of the largest and oldest in Europe, in operation since 1894 and covering over 200 km of rails, including 62 km in Katowice proper. The network in Katowice is mostly located in the northern part of the city has a star-like shape, with most lines converging on the Rynek square and expanding to all directions. There are 13 tram lines in Katowice, all but 2 expanding into neighboring cities. 116 tram stops are located in Katowice proper, as of 2020. A new tram line is planned to the southern suburbs since 2016. 

In addition to trams, bus lines are organized by ZTM. There are currently 63 regular lines in Katowice (including night lines), and additional 10 express metropolitan lines, with 609 bus stops as of 2020. ZTM organizes a bus line to their airport as well, which runs every 30 minutes between 4am and 9:30pm and every hour at night.

Commuter trains 
Koleje Śląskie (Silesian Railways), a regional railway authority, connects Katowice with its suburbs and other major cities in Silesian and Lesser Poland voivodeships: Gliwice, Rybnik, Częstochowa, Bielsko-Biała, Kraków, and Oświęcim, among others. It operates 9 regular lines and 1 tourist weekend line (to Zakopane).

Polregio operates commuter trains from Katowice to cities and towns in Lesser Poland and Świętokrzyskie voivodeships: Trzebinia, Olkusz, and Kielce, among others.

Long-haul trains 
Katowice is the main railway hub in southern Poland. Katowice's main railway station is the fifth-busiest train station in Poland as of 2019 (and third outside Warsaw), with 17.6 million passengers and growing 47 percent since 2015. 16% of the passengers travelled on PKP Intercity train, the main long-distance train operator in Poland.

Katowice has a direct Express Intercity Premium (high-speed) connection to Warsaw through the Centralna Magistrala Kolejowa, with a run time of 2 hours 21 minutes. PKP Intercity also offers direct standard connections to Kraków (under 1 hour), Wrocław, Kielce and Ostrava (under 2 hours), Warsaw, Rzeszów, Olomouc, and Łódź (under 3 hours), Poznań (under 4 hours), Brno, Vienna and Bratislava (under 5 hours), as well as Prague, Budapest, and Berlin.

Long-haul coach lines 
Katowice has a modern international bus station located close to the city center. There are over 400 connections on a typical weekday, with the most-popular ones being domestic destinations in Poland and cities in Ukraine.

Cycling, walking and other 
Cycling is becoming a more popular mode of transportation in Katowice. The municipal bicycle system is operated by Nextbike and has 83 stations with over 600 bicycles. Rides under 15 minutes are free, those 15–60 minutes are PLN 1 and each additional hour becomes more expensive.

Bolt and Blinkee operate commercial systems of scooter share. Traficar and Panek Car Share operate commercial carshare systems.

Freeways, roads and streets

Katowice has an extensive network of freeways, roads and streets, totaling over 1,120 km in length. The well-developed network supports over 200,000 cars registered in Katowice, and 49 percent of commuters that drive alone, a high share compared to other major cities in Poland. Several freeways in Katowice are among the busiest in Poland: expressway S86 between Sosnowiec and Katowice's city center and highway A4 between Murckowska and Mikołowska interchanges both see over 100,000 cars passing each day.

Katowice has a ring around its city center, consisting of highway A4, Murckowska freeway, Drogowa Trasa Średnicowa (a freeway-style road connecting downtowns of cities in the Upper Silesian Metropolitan Area) that partly goes in a tunnel underground and Bocheńskiego road. Many of the roads and freeways in Katowice expand radially from the city center and replaced old local roads.

Main roads 
European route E40 passes through Katowice as highway A4. It enters the city from Chorzów and continues eastward, with three lanes in each direction on the main road and two to three lanes in parallel access roads. It meets Bocheńskiego road and continues towards Mikołowska interchange, which is one of the only combination interchanges in Poland and the main exit towards the city center. After that interchange, the highway loses its access roads due to lack of space in the dense urban area and continues east with four lanes in each direction. Access roads appear again (only on the south side, though) after around 500 meters and there is an exit towards Francuska Street. After another 1.5 kilometer, access roads appear again on the north side, too, and there is a tight exit towards Pułaskiego Street. The highway then runs into Murckowska interchange, before exiting the city.

National road 79 (DK79) enters Katowice from Chorzów and separates the Silesian Park and Osiedle Tysiąclecia in Katowice. It then merges with Drogowa Trasa Średnicowa (DTŚ) at the junction with Bocheńskiego road and Złota Street. It continues with DTŚ through the Katowice city center and descents into a tunnel under the Rondo roundabout. It then emerges overground again, right before an interchange with DK86. The road continues eastward as a freeway with exits towards Zawodzie and Szopienice neighborhoods for several more kilometers, before entering Mysłowice and becoming a standard-access road.

National road 81 (DK81) enters Katowice from Mikołów and runs through the southern residential neighborhoods as an arterial road with two lanes in each direction, named Kościuszki Street. In the Brynów neighborhood, Kościuszki Street continues towards Katowice's city center while NR 81 turns east, to run through the forest towards the interchange with DK86.

National road 86 (DK86) enters Katowice from Sosnowiec as expressway S86 up until Roździeńskiego interchange where it meets DK79 and loses its expressway status. It then continues south as Murckowska freeway east of the city center. It meets highway A4 and then passes by Giszowiec neighborhood and continues through the woods southward, with exits towards Murcki neighborhood (from which it gets its name) and Kostuchna. It bypasses Murcki from the east and continues south towards Tychy.

Tempo 30 Zone 
In 2015, Katowice designated most of its city center as a  zone, in an effort to curb traffic fatalities and crashes. Within 3 years of operation, the number of accidents dropped by 41 percent, including 37 percent drop in accidents involving pedestrians and cyclists. The accidents are also less severe: there was a 55 percent drop in injured pedestrians and cyclists.

Airports

The airport is a focus city for LOT Polish Airlines, Ryanair and its subsidiary Buzz, Wizz Air, Smartwings, and Enter Air. The busiest routes are: London, Dortmund, Antalya, Eindhoven, Warsaw and Frankfurt. Katowice is the largest leisure travel airport in Poland. Long-haul flights are operated from Katowice to Varadero in Cuba, Bangkok in Thailand, Cancún in Mexico, Malé in Maldives and to Puerto Plata as well as Punta Cana in Dominican Republic. Katowice is also the second-largest cargo airport, after Warsaw Chopin. The airport is accessed through a metropolitan express bus line, running every 30 minutes between 4am and 9:30pm and every hour at night. A new train station at the airport is under construction, scheduled to be operational in 2023.

Katowice is also within an hour drive from Kraków Airport, which offers additional destinations and airlines such as Amsterdam (KLM), Paris (Air France), Helsinki (Finnair), Chicago and Newark (LOT Polish Airlines), Copenhagen and Stockholm (SAS) and Zurich (Swiss). The airport can be access through scheduled buses leaving from Katowice bus station every 30–60 minutes.

Sports
Katowice has a long sporting tradition and hosted the final of EuroBasket 2009 and 1975 European Athletics Indoor Championships, 1975 European Amateur Boxing Championships, 1976 World Ice Hockey Championships, 1957, 1985 European Weightlifting Championships, 1974, 1982 World Wrestling Championships, 1991 World Amateur Bodybuilding Championships, 2011 Women's European Union Amateur Boxing Championships, 2014 FIVB Men's World Championship and others.

The Stadion Śląski is between Chorzów and Katowice. It was a national stadium of Poland, with more than 50 international matches of the Poland national football team played here and around 30 matches in UEFA competitions. There were also a Speedway World Championship, Speedway Grand Prix of Europe and many concerts featuring international stars.

Tourists can relax playing tennis or squash, doing water sports also sailing (for example—in Dolina Trzech Stawów), horse-riding (in Wesoła Fala and Silesian culture and refreshment park), cycling or going to one of numerous excellently equipped fitness clubs. Near the city centre are sporting facilities like swimming pools (for example "Bugla", "Rolna") and in neighbourhood—Golf courses (in Siemianowice Śląskie).

Sports clubs
GKS Katowice – men's football, (Polish Cup winner: 1986, 1991, 1993; Polish SuperCup winner: 1991, 1995; 1st league in 2003/2004 and 2004/2005 seasons). ice hockey team Champion: 1958, 1960, 1962 Górnik Katowice / GKS 1965, 1968, 1970.
1. FC Kattowitz – football club, vice-champion of Poland: 1927; champion of Upper Silesia: 1907, 1908, 1909, 1913, 1922, 1932, 1945
AZS AWF Katowice – various sports, women's handball team playing in Polish Women's Handball Superleague, men's basketball team playing in the second league, fencing section – many medals in the Polish Championship
Naprzód Janów Katowice – hockey club playing in Polish Hockey Superleague, vice-champion of Poland (5x): 1971, 1973, 1977, 1989, 1992; bronze medal (7x): 1972, 1974, 1976, 1978, 1982, 1986, 1987; Polish Cup (1x): 1970.
AZS US Katowice – various sports, many medals in the Polish Championship in various sports
HKS Szopienice – various sports, many medals in the Polish and Europe and World Championship in weightlifting
Silesia Miners – American football club playing in Polish American Football League, Polish champion in 2009, vice-champion in 2007
Jango Katowice – futsal club playing in Polish Futsal Superleague; Polish Cup (1x): 2007; bronze medal Polish Championship (2x): 2001, 2007
Rozwój Katowice – football club playing in Polish Third League
MK Katowice – football club playing in Polish Fourth League
Hetman Szopienice – chess club, many medals in the Polish Championship
Sparta Katowice – various sports, many medals in the Polish Championship in various sports
Policyjny Klub Sportowy Katowice – various sports, many medals in the Polish Championship in various sports
AWF Mickiewicz Katowice – basketball club
Silesian Flying club (Aeroklub Śląski)

Defunct sports clubs:
Diana Kattowitz – football club
Germania Kattowitz – football club
KS Baildon Katowice – various sports, many medals in the Polish Championship in various sports
Pogoń Katowice – various sports, many medals in the Polish Championship in various sports

Sports events

1975 European Athletics Indoor Championships
1976 World Ice Hockey Championships
FIVB World League 2001
FIVB World League 2007
Eurobasket 2009
Tour de Pologne 2010
BNP Paribas Katowice Open
EMS One Katowice 2014 (CS:GO Major Championship)
IEM World Championship Katowice 2015
ESL One Katowice 2015 (CS:GO Major Championship)
IEM World Championship Katowice 2016
IEM World Championship Katowice 2017 
Overwatch World Cup 2017 Qualifier
IEM World Championship Katowice 2018 
IEM World Championship Katowice 2019 (CS:GO Major Championship)
ESL One Katowice 2019
BWF World Senior Badminton Championships 2019
IEM Katowice 2020
Intel Extreme Masters Season XVI - Katowice

Notable people

Hans Sachs (1877–1945), serologist
Kurt Goldstein (1878–1965), neurologist
Erich Przywara (1889–1972), priest
Hans Mikosch (1898–1993), general
Hans Källner (1898–1945), general
Franz Leopold Neumann (1900–1954), politician
Willy Fritsch (1901–1973), actor
Hans Bellmer (1902–1975), surrealist photographer
Hans-Christoph Seebohm (1903–1967), politician
Maria Goeppert-Mayer (1906–1972), physicist, Nobel Prize winner
Kurt Schwaen (1909–2007), composer
Rudolf Schnackenburg (1914–2002), priest
Georg Thomalla (1915–1999), actor
Ernst Wilimowski (1916–1997), football player
Ernst Plener (1919–2007), football player
Anneli Cahn Lax (1922–1999), mathematician
Richard Herrmann (1923–1962), football player
Chaskel Besser (1923–2010), Orthodox rabbi
Kazimierz Kutz (1929–2018), film director and politician
Waldemar Świerzy (1931–2013), artist, illustrator and cartoonist
Wojciech Kilar (1932–2013), classical and film music composer
Henryk Górecki (1933–2010), classical composer
Władysław Masłowski (1933–1986), journalist and press researcher
Janusz Sidło (1933–1993), javelin thrower
Josef Kompalla (born 1936), ice hockey player and referee
Henryk Broder (born 1946), journalist
Krzysztof Krawczyk (1946–2021), singer, guitarist and composer
Jerzy Kukuczka (1948–1989), alpine and high altitude climber
Joanna Kluzik-Rostkowska (born 1963), politician
Elżbieta Bieńkowska (born 1964), politician
Alicja Kwade (born 1979), contemporary visual artist
Jan P. Matuszyński (born 1984), film director 
Grzegorz Kosok (born 1986), volleyball player
Zuzanna Bijoch (born 1994), fashion model

Twin towns – sister cities

Katowice is twinned with:

 Cologne, Germany
 Donetsk, Ukraine
 Groningen, Netherlands
 Košice, Slovakia
 Lviv, Ukraine
 Miskolc, Hungary
 Mobile, United States
 Odense, Denmark
 Opava, Czech Republic
 Ostrava, Czech Republic
 Pula, Croatia
 Saint-Étienne, France
 Shenyang, China
 South Dublin, Ireland

See also

 List of mayors of Katowice
 List of tallest buildings in Katowice

Notes

References

External links

 The Municipal Council of the City of Katowice
 Interesting things and places in Katowice

 
Cities and towns in Silesian Voivodeship
Cities in Silesia
City counties of Poland
Silesian Voivodeship (1920–1939)
Province of Upper Silesia